Siegfried Rosengart (1894 – 1985) was a German-Swiss art dealer.

Early life 
Rosengart was born in 1894. His parents were Heinrich Rosengart (1850–1921), a bed feather maker, and Selma Thannhauser. His uncles, Joseph Rosengart and Heinrich Thannhauser, were both involved in art.

In 1912 Rosengart was influenced by a visit to the Sonderbund exhibition in Cologne in 1912, which featured modern art. He met Picasso while studying French in Paris in 1913–14. In 1919, Rosengart joined his uncle Heinrich Thannhauser's gallery. Rosengart opened a branch for Thannhauser in Lucerne in 1920, managing it until 1937. In 1933 he received Swiss citizenship.

Art dealing and collecting 
Rosengart's daughter, Angela, joined him in running the gallery in 1948, becoming a partner in 1957.

Rosengart sold artworks  to museums, like the Kunstsammlung Nordrhein-Westfalen (North Rhine-Westphalia Art Collection) in Düsseldorf, as well as to private collectors like Etta and Claribel Cone (Gauguin, "Woman with Mango," Matisse, "Odalisque," Picasso, "Mother and Child," now Baltimore Musée). Child," now Baltimore Mus.) and Samuel Courtauld (Manet, "A Bar in the Folies Bergère," London). He dealt frequently in works by Paul Klee.

He acted as an advisor and intermediary for Bernhard Sprengel (1899–1985) and Peter Ludwig (1925-96).

Rosengart also collected art for his own private collection. 

In 1971, he and his daughter Angela donated a Picasso painting to the Kunsthaus Zürich in 1971. In 1978, with eight artworks, they created a small Picasso museum for the city of Lucerne, adding about 200 photographs of Picasso by David Douglas Duncan in 1992..

Legacy 
Rosengart died in 1985. Since then, his daughter has continued to run the gallery. In 1992 she established a charitable foundation to preserve and exhibit the Rosengart collection. In March 2002 it opened in the former building of the Swiss. National Bank in Lucerne. The core of the collection consists of 47 paintings and drawings by Picasso from the years between 1904 and 1972, as well as 125 selected Klee works from all creative periods, making it one of the most important private Klee collections internationally.  It also includes three paintings by Cezanne as well as paintings by Monet, Pissarro, Renoir, Seurat, the Nabis artists Bonnard and Vuillard, and works by Modigliani, Soutine, Matisse, Braque, Léger, Kandinsky, Miró and Chagall.

References 

1894 births
1985 deaths
Swiss art dealers
Swiss Jews
20th-century German Jews